Helengrad was a satirical or pejorative neologism in New Zealand politics applied to New Zealand's capital city Wellington during the term of the Fifth Labour Government led by Helen Clark. The term was used by the Labour party's opponents and critics, who sometimes extended it to describe the New Zealand of the time as a whole.

In January 2008, the term 'Helengrad', "a noun used to describe the iron grip of New Zealand's prime minister over Wellington", was reported as having made Australia's Macquarie online dictionary among 85 other new words.

Origin
The Helen aspect is derived from Helen Clark, Prime Minister of New Zealand from 1999 to 2008. The suffix -grad (-град in Cyrillic) alludes to cities of the former Soviet Union named after political leaders, such as Leningrad and Stalingrad. The term was  used derisively by political opponents of Clark and the Labour Party to equate their ideology and political views with socialism and communism. In a similar way they referred to Helen Clark as "Comrade Helen".

Use
The term was reputedly first used by a caller to Lindsay Perigo's 'Politically Incorrect Show' on Radio Pacific in late 1999 or early 2000, and went on to gain traction in the media and in political circles following its appearance on the cover of the May/June 2000 issue of the magazine 'The Free Radical,' published early April 2000.
A commentary in the Evening Post ascribed the reason to the nickname "Does she (Helen Clark) know the Capital's earned the nickname, Helengrad, such is her total command of issues, initiatives and air time?"

In a 2000 feature article, "Siege of Helengrad," The Australian newspaper wrote that Clark's "uncompromisingly autocratic and pervasive leadership has seen New Zealand dubbed Helengrad".

See also 
 Fifth Labour Government of New Zealand

References

External links
PC's Blog – 'Helengrad': Where did it come from?
Peter Cresswell – The Hooey From Helengrad

Political history of New Zealand
Political terminology in New Zealand
New Zealand Labour Party
New Zealand slang
Helen Clark